Karim Ahmed Kassem (also spelled Karim Assem; born 8 October 1986) is an Egyptian actor.

Biography
Karim was born on 8 October 1986 in Cairo, Egypt. He is a Muslim himself though had a multi-faith religious upbringing celebrating all Jewish, Christian and Muslim holidays as a child. His late mother was Jewish and his father is a Muslim and is from both Islamic and Christian faith heritage. His paternal grandfather was Muslim and his paternal grandmother was a Christian. His maternal grandfather was a Jewish anti-Zionist who refused to immigrate to Israel, believing Zionism to be a "racist" movement. His maternal grandfather was a prominent Egyptian nationalist.

He is a graduate of the American University in Cairo, where he studied theatre and acted in many of the university's plays. He is trilingual in Egyptian Arabic (also Standard Arabic), French and English.

Discovered in 2006 while taking an acting workshop, he had his cinematic breakthrough in the teen drug film Awqat Faragh meaning "Spare time". Kassem has co-starred with colleague Amr Abed in three of his films.

Filmography

Television

Theatre

References

External links
 
 Official Instagram page

1986 births
Male actors from Cairo
The American University in Cairo alumni
Egyptian male film actors
Egyptian male television actors
Egyptian people of Jewish descent
Living people
Egyptian Muslims